This is a list of rural localities in Nizhny Novgorod Oblast. Nizhny Novgorod Oblast (Nizhegorodskaya oblast), also known as Nizhegorod Oblast, is a federal subject of Russia (an oblast). Its administrative center is the city of Nizhny Novgorod. It has a population of 3,310,597 as of the 2010 Census.

Arzamassky District
Rural localities in Arzamassky District:

 Abramovo

Bolsheboldinsky District 
Rural localities in Bolsheboldinsky District:

 Bolshoye Boldino

Bor 
Rural localities in Bor:

 Pamyat Parizhskoy Kommuny

Buturlinsky District 
Rural localities in Buturlinsky District:

 Yakubovka

Diveyevsky District 
Rural localities in Diveyevsky District:

 Diveyevo

Gaginsky District 
Rural localities in Gaginsky District:

 Gagino

Krasnooktyabrsky District 
Rural localities in Krasnooktyabrsky District:

 Abramovo
 Urazovka

Kstovsky District 
Rural localities in Kstovsky District:

 Fedyakovo
 Veliky Vrag

Pavlovsky District 
Rural localities in Pavlovsky District:

 Ababkovo

Pervomaysk 
Rural localities in Pervomaysk urban okrug:

 Alatyr

Pochinkovsky District 
Rural localities in Pochinkovsky District:

 Pochinki

Sechenovsky District 
Rural localities in Sechenovsky District:

 Sechenovo

Sergachsky District 
Rural localities in Sergachsky District:

 Abaimovo

Shatkovsky District 
Rural localities in Shatkovsky District:

 Krasny Bor

Spassky District 
Rural localities in Spassky District:

 Spasskoye

Vachsky District 
Rural localities in Vachsky District:

 Bolshoye Zagarino
 Krasno

Vadsky District 
Rural localities in Vadsky District:

 Vad

Volodarsky District 
Rural localities in Volodarsky District:

 Mulino

Vyksa 
Rural localities in Vyksa urban okrug:

 Verkhnyaya Vereya

See also 
 
 Lists of rural localities in Russia

References 

Nizhny Novgorod Oblast